The Richmond Renegades was a SPHL ice hockey team in Richmond, Virginia. The team, owned by Allan B. Harvie Jr., the founder of the former ECHL Renegades franchise, began play in October 2006 at the Richmond Coliseum. The team's first head coach was John Brophy. After the Renegades loss in the first round of the 2007 playoffs, Brian Goudie replaced Brophy as head coach.

The new Renegades replaced the United Hockey League Richmond RiverDogs, who relocated to suburban Chicago for the 2006–07 season to become the Chicago Hounds. The most recent Renegades were the second team with that name; the first was an ECHL team that played from 1990–2003.

The Richmond Renegades ceased operations at the end of the 2008–09 SPHL season.

08-09 Roster

Season-by-season record

Note: GP = Games played, W = Wins, L = Losses, OTL = Overtime Losses, Pts = Points, GF = Goals for, GA = Goals against, PIM = Penalties in minutes

Attendance

Single Season Team Records
through 2007–08 season

Games Played: (56) Danny White , JJ Wrobel , and Phil Youngclaus 

Goals: (33) Andre Gill  (2007–2008)

Assists: (57) Dan Vandermeer  (2007–2008)

Points: (70) Dan Vandermeer  (2007–2008)

+/-: (+23) Dan Vandermeer  (2007–2008)

Penalty Minutes: (428) Mat Goody   (2006–2007)

Wins: (20) Doug Groenestege  (2006–2007)

Shutouts: (2) Doug Groenestege  (2006–2007), Ryan Senft   (2007–2008)

Minutes: (2254:18) Doug Groenestege  (2006–2007)

GAA: (3.13) Ryan Senft   (2007–2008)

Saves: (1333) Doug Groenestege  (2006–2007)

SV%: (.909) Doug Groenestege  (2006–2007)

Retired numbers

Honors

References

Sports in Richmond, Virginia
Ice hockey teams in Virginia
Defunct Southern Professional Hockey League teams
Defunct ice hockey teams in the United States
Ice hockey clubs established in 2006
Ice hockey clubs disestablished in 2009
2006 establishments in Virginia
2009 disestablishments in Virginia